Soperton may refer to:

Soperton, Georgia, a city in Treutlen County
Soperton, Ontario, a community in the township of Leeds and the Thousand Islands
Soperton, Wisconsin, an unincorporated community in Forest County